Joe Philbin (born 16 November 1994) is a professional rugby league footballer who plays as a  and  for the Warrington Wolves in the Super League. He has played for Ireland, Great Britain and the England Knights at international level.

He has spent time on loan from Warrington at the Swinton Lions and the Bradford Bulls in the Championship, and the North Wales Crusaders in Championship 1 and the Rochdale Hornets in League 1.

Background
Philbin was born in Warrington, Cheshire, England.

Playing career
Philbin his junior rugby at local amateur clubs Culcheth Eagles and Latchford Albion before joining Warrington Wolves, aged 16.

Warrington Wolves
He broke into the Warrington first team in 2014. His début was against the Hull Kingston Rovers, where he unfortunately picked up a hip injury. Philbin returned for the first team a month later against the London Broncos.

Philbin scored his first career try against the Catalans Dragons in February 2015, and the following week he scored again, this time against Hull Kingston Rovers.

Philbin played in the 2018 Challenge Cup Final defeat by the Catalans Dragons at Wembley Stadium.
Philbin played in the 2018 Super League Grand Final defeat by Wigan at Old Trafford.
Philbin played in the 2019 Challenge Cup Final victory over St. Helens at Wembley Stadium.

Bradford
He was sent on a month's loan to Super League side Bradford in January 2014.

Swinton
Joe has featured in two matches via dual registration for Swinton, and scored one try.

International career
In 2016 he was called up to the Ireland squad for the 2017 Rugby League World Cup European Pool B qualifiers.

In 2018 he was selected for the England Knights on their tour of Papua New Guinea. He played against Papua New Guinea at the Lae Football Stadium and the Oil Search National Football Stadium.

He was added to the Great Britain Lions Elite Performance squad in September 2019.

He was selected in squad for the 2019 Great Britain Lions tour of the Southern Hemisphere.

References

External links
Warrington Wolves profile
SL profile
(archived by web.archive.org) Statistics at rlwc2017.com

1994 births
Living people
Bradford Bulls players
English people of Irish descent
England Knights national rugby league team players
English rugby league players
Ireland national rugby league team players
North Wales Crusaders players
Rochdale Hornets players
Rugby league players from Warrington
Rugby league second-rows
Swinton Lions players
Warrington Wolves players
Great Britain national rugby league team players